The Jardin anglais (literally "English garden") is an urban park in Geneva, Switzerland, situated at the location of an ancient harbor and a wood. It marks the beginning of the Quai Gustave-Ador.

The park was created in 1855. In 1863 the building process of the Pont du Mont-Blanc changed the park to its actual form – a trapezoid/trapezium of 25430 m2.

The Park hosts the Le monument national and the L'horloge fleurie (or Flower clock), besides several pavilions, a sculpted bronze fountain by Alexis Andre and a coffeehouse.

Annually, it hosts the Geneva Christmas Market.

Notes and references

See also 
 Fêtes de Genève

External links 

 Jardin anglais page at the City of Geneva website

Tourist attractions in Geneva
Parks in Switzerland
Geography of Geneva